Pierre Chayriguès (2 May 1892 – 19 March 1965) was a French footballer who played as a goalkeeper. He was part of France national team at the 1924 Summer Olympics.

He was the first prominent French goalkeeper and is still today the youngest goalkeeper at the age of 19 to represent France. In 1913, he was approached by Tottenham Hotspur F.C.

References

External links
 
 

1892 births
1965 deaths
Association football goalkeepers
Footballers from Paris
French footballers
France international footballers
Olympic footballers of France
Footballers at the 1924 Summer Olympics
Red Star F.C. players
French football managers